The 1990 La Flèche Wallonne was the 54th edition of La Flèche Wallonne cycle race and was held on 11 April 1990. The race started in Spa and finished in Huy. The race was won by Moreno Argentin of the Ariostea team.

General classification

Notes

References

1990 in road cycling
1990
1990 in Belgian sport